My Little Pony is a British tie-in comic books to the toys of the same name, published by Egmont under the license of Hasbro, during the so-called "Generation One" era. There were two publications: The first comic, simply known as My Little Pony, ran from 1985 to 1993 and published 224 issues; The second comic, My Little Pony and Friends, featuring the characters from the American television anthology series with the similar name, ran from 1987 to 1994 and featured 51 issues. Art was sent via fax to England from a Spanish art company, Selecciones Ilustradas. The comics were published by London Edition Magazines (renamed Fleetway Editions in 1992) and Egmont UK.

Continuity
The comics, although sharing many characters, locations and stories from the cartoon (My Little Pony and Friends comic 30 included a story featuring the Smooze and the other antagonists from the 1986 movie), the comics seem to be set in their own continuity, with such differences to the cartoon as the complete absence of Megan's younger siblings, Danny and Molly (except for And Friends comic 30, where Reeka and Draggle, Hydia's daughters from the movie, disguise themselves as Danny and Molly to trick Megan). Other stories and characters were exclusive to the comics too, such as The Know-All Gnomes, Wizard Wantall, Rob Rabbit, Flower Lady, and the Forgetful (or Fun) Witch. The comics also featured characters from fairy tales and legends, such as Humpty Dumpty and the Man In The Moon. Another difference is that all ponies possessed magical qualities, rather than just unicorns as in the cartoon.

Comics

My Little Pony

My Little Pony and Friends

My Little Pony comics
American comics titles
British comics titles
Comics about animals
Comics about mammals
Comics based on Hasbro toys
Comics based on television series